is one of the most famous maple leaves valley parks in Japan. The park is located at the foot of Mt. Misen, along Momijidani River, behind Itsukushima Shrine in Miyajima, Hatsukaichi, Hiroshima. There are more than 200 maples, including 110 acer palmatum thunberg, 60 palmatum var. matsumurae, 10 acer rufinerve, acer buergerianum, acer sieboldianum miquel and acer amoenum carriere var. amoenum.

See also
Itsukushima
Itsukushima Shrine
Mt. Misen
Setonaikai National Park

External links
Momijidani Park

Parks in Japan
Parks and gardens in Hiroshima Prefecture